Ta'ase Faumui (born March 19, 1971) is a former American football defensive end who played two seasons with the Pittsburgh Steelers of the National Football League (NFL).  He was drafted by the Pittsburgh Steelers in the fourth round of the 1994 NFL Draft with the 122nd overall pick. Faumui played college football at the University of Hawaii at Manoa and attended Farrington High School in Honolulu, Hawaii. He was also a member of the Amsterdam Admirals and Oakland Raiders.

External links
Just Sports Stats

Living people
1971 births
Players of American football from Honolulu
Samoan players of American football
American football defensive ends
Hawaii Rainbow Warriors football players
Pittsburgh Steelers players
Amsterdam Admirals players
Samoan emigrants to the United States
American sportspeople of Samoan descent